Neil Banfield (born 20 January 1962) is an English professional football coach and former player. He is an assistant manager at Rangers.

Banfield played in the Football League for Crystal Palace and Leyton Orient. He became a coach at Charlton Athletic, before moving to Arsenal as a youth coach. In 2012, Banfield was appointed first-team coach under Arsène Wenger at Arsenal, then moved to Queens Park Rangers.

Playing career

Club
Banfield was born on 20 January 1962 in Poplar, London. He played district and England schoolboy and youth football and joined Crystal Palace as an apprentice in August 1979, with whom he won the 1978 FA Youth Cup in a 1–0 victory over Aston Villa. He made only three first team appearances for Palace and in 1981, joined Australian side Adelaide City for two seasons. In December 1983, he moved to Leyton Orient, making 31 league appearances in two seasons before joining Dagenham and Redbridge in May 1985.

International
Banfield was an England schoolboy international, and was a member of the England team that won the 1980 UEFA European Under-18 Championship.

Managerial career
After his retirement he became a coach. He started his coaching career with Charlton Athletic with whom he spent five years as the head coach at the club's academy. Banfield then joined Arsenal in 1997. Banfield went on to coach Arsenal's academy teams with whom he won two FA Youth Cups, an FA Premier Academy League U17 title in 1999–2000 and an U19 League title in 2001–02. He then succeeded Eddie Niedzwiecki as the coach of Arsenal Reserves after the former's departure for Blackburn Rovers in September 2004.

Banfield also served under Don Givens as the assistant manager of the Republic of Ireland U21 team. He held this post from April 2004 to May of the following year. On 24 May 2012, Banfield took up the position of first-team coach for Arsenal, a role he held until 2018.

On 14 May 2019, Banfield was appointed first-team coach at Queens Park Rangers On 28 November 2022, Banfield joined Michael Beale in moving to Rangers.

Honours

Club
Crystal Palace
FA Youth Cup: 1978

Country
England U18
UEFA Under-18 Championship: 1980

Managerial career
Arsenal Youth
FA Youth Cup: 2000, 2001
Premier Academy League U17: 1999–2000
Premier Academy League U19: 2001–02

References

External links
 

1962 births
Living people
Footballers from Poplar, London
English footballers
National Soccer League (Australia) players
Adelaide City FC players
Crystal Palace F.C. players
Grays Athletic F.C. players
Leyton Orient F.C. players
English football managers
Arsenal F.C. non-playing staff
English Football League players
Association football defenders
Rangers F.C. non-playing staff